Stall-Erik och snapphanarna is a Swedish film project directed by and starring Anders Olofsson. The narrative is set between 1658 and the early 18th century and tells the story of the snapphanar, a pro-Danish guerrilla movement that fought against Sweden in the 17th century. Olofsson, an amateur filmmaker who works as a cleaner by day, began to shoot the film in 1996. His ability to recruit many established actors, as well as the long production process, has received publicity in several regional and national newspapers. The film was set to be finished in 2020. However, in early 2020, Olofsson set a goal to involve 100 celebrities in the film, and thus revised his estimated completion time to 2025.

Cast

Notes

Swedish drama films
Upcoming films